The following is a list of notable former employees of McKinsey & Company, a management consulting firm founded in 1926. This group is often referred to as a group in its own right. According to the company's information, there are currently 34,000 McKinsey alumni working at over 15,000 organizations across the private, public, and social sectors in 120 countries.

Business
Vikram Akula – founder and former CEO of SKS Microfinance
Imran Amed – founder of Business of Fashion
Mahlon Apgar IV – founder of Apgar & Company
Frank Appel – CEO of Deutsche Post DHL
Delphine Arnault – Executive Vice President of Louis Vuitton
Carter F. Bales – co-founder, chairman and Managing Partner of NewWorld Capital Group
Sir John Banham – former director-general of the Chicago Bridge & Iron Company and former chairman of Whitbread
Bengt Baron – gold medalist at the 1980 Summer Olympics, former CEO and president of Vin & Spirit
Dominic Barton – former global managing director of McKinsey & Company
Oliver Bäte – CEO of Allianz
Wolfgang Bernhard – Daimler board member and executive
John Birt, Baron Birt – former director-general of the BBC (1992–2000) and special adviser to Tony Blair
Martin Blessing – CEO of Commerzbank
André Borschberg – founder of Solar Impulse
Marvin Bower – Managing Director of McKinsey & Company (1950–67)
Roelof Botha – Senior steward at Sequoia Capital
Robert Brisco – CEO of Internet Brands
Matt Brittin – Head of EMEA at Google
Shona Brown – former Google executive
Adam Cahan — Yahoo executive
Francesco Caio – serial CEO and/or founder from Omnitel, Olivetti, Merloni, Netscalibur and Cable & Wireless plc
Roderick Carnegie — Chairman of the Pacific Edge Group
Humphrey Cobbold – former CEO cycling business Wiggle and current CEO of PureGym
Ronald Cohen – co-founder and former chairman of Apax Partners
Matt Cohler — General Partner at Benchmark Capital
David Coleman – CEO of The College Board
Vittorio Colao – CEO of Vodafone
Richard Currie — former Chairman of BCE Inc and Bell Canada
Ian Davis – former Managing Director of McKinsey & Company and current chairman for Rolls-Royce Holdings
Ron Daniel — former worldwide managing director at McKinsey & Company
Julian Day – former CEO of Kmart and RadioShack
Dido Harding – CEO of TalkTalk Group and Member of the House of Lords
Henrique De Castro – former Google executive and former chief operating officer of Yahoo!
Etienne de Villiers – former Executive Chairman and President of the ATP Tour, former President of Walt Disney, and former chairman of BBC Worldwide
David Carl Edelman - CMO at Aetna
John Elliott – Australian businessman
Erik Engstrom – CEO of Reed Elsevier
Carolyn Fairbairn – former BBC and ITV executive
Diana Farrell – CEO of JPMorgan Chase Institute
Bernard T. Ferrari – Dean of Johns Hopkins University Carey Business School
Richard N. Foster – managing partner of Investment and Advisory Services LLC
Jane Fraser – CEO of Citigroup
Jeff George – CEO of Sandoz International GmbH
Mike George – president and CEO of QVC Inc
Louis V. Gerstner, Jr. – former chairman and CEO of IBM and former chairman of The Carlyle Group
Shuman Ghosemajumder — CTO of Shape Security
Caroline Ghosn - cofounder and CEO of Levo League
George N. Gillett, Jr. – founder of Gillette Holdings. Former owner of the Montreal Canadiens and England's Liverpool Football Club
Simon Glinsky – Co-founder of Match.com later Match Group
James P. Gorman – chairman and CEO of Morgan Stanley
Mario Greco – CEO of Zurich Insurance Group
Stephen Green (banker) – chairman of HSBC
Rajat Gupta – Managing Director of McKinsey & Company (1994–2003)
Bob Haas – chairman of Levi Strauss & Co
John Hagel – author and consultant
Torstein Hagen – founder of Viking River Cruises
Suzanne Heywood — chairperson of  CNH Industrial
Ken Hicks – CEO of Foot Locker
 Dennis F. Hightower - former President, Europe, Middle East & Africa (Paris) and President, Television & Telecommunications at Walt Disney. Former CEO, Europe Online Networks (Luxembourg)
Kathleen Hogan - Chief People Officer at Microsoft
Charlotte Hogg – COO of the Bank of England
Egil Hogna — CEO of Sapa Group
Betsy Holden – former co-CEO of Kraft Foods; later joined McKinsey as a senior advisor
Amy Howe — current Chief Operating Officer (COO) of Ticketmaster, a Live Nation subsidiary
Eric Janvier – co-founder, Schlumberger Business Consulting
Hubert Joly – CEO of Best Buy and former CEO of hospitality companies
Aditya Julka – founder of Paddle8
Markus Kattner — former Secretary-General of FIFA
Jon Katzenbach – Founder of Katzenbach Partners
Thomas Kurian — CEO of Google Cloud
Hosein Khajeh-Hosseiny — British Private Equity investor
Andrew Thomas Kearney – Founder of management consulting firm A.T. Kearney
Susanne Klatten – Germany's richest woman; heir to the BMW fortune
Marius Kloppers – former CEO of BHP
Jørgen Vig Knudstorp – CEO of Lego Group
Melanie Kreis — CFO Deutsche Post
Anil Kumar – former Director at McKinsey & Company and co-founder of the Indian School of Business who pled guilty to insider trading
Mark Leiter (businessman) — Chairman and Chief Strategy Officer of Leiter & Company
Tom Leppert — CEO of Kaplan, Inc
Helge Lund – CEO of BG Group and former CEO of StatoilHydro
Alonzo L. McDonald — former President and Vice Chairman of the Bendix Corporation
Aslaug Magnusdottir – founder of fashion company Tinker Tailor (brand)
Fred Malek — former President of Marriott Hotels and Northwest Airlines
John C. Malone – former chairman of Liberty Media; CEO and Chairman of Discovery Holding Company
Charlie Mayfield – chairman of John Lewis Partnership 2007 - 
James Paul Manzi – chairman and CEO of Lotus Development Corporation
James McNerney – former chairman and CEO of Boeing
Kip Meek — former chairman of the Broadband Stakeholder Group
Kathryn Minshew – cofounder of TheMuse.com
Deanna M. Mulligan – CEO of Guardian Life
Tomoko Namba – founder of mobile games developer DeNA
Ian Narev – CEO of Commonwealth Bank
Roberto Nicastro – head of retail at Unicredit Group
Kenichi Ohmae – corporate strategist
Azran Osman Rani – CEO of AirAsia X
David Palecek — US management consultant 
Helmut Panke – former chairman and CEO of BMW
Roger Parry – former chairman and CEO of Clear Channel International. Current chairman of YouGov
Corrado Passera – former Italian Minister of Development and Minister of Infrastructures and ex-CEO of Intesa Sanpaolo
Prashant Pathak – Managing Partner of ReichmannHauer Capital Partners
Michael Patsalos-Fox — Chairman, President & CEO at Vidyo
J. Michael Pearson – former CEO and chairman of Valeant Pharmaceuticals
Edgar Perez – author of The Speed Traders and Knightmare on Wall Street
Sundar Pichai – CEO of Alphabet Inc and Google
Patrick Pichette - Former CFO of Google and Venture Capitalist
Alessandro Profumo – former CEO of UniCredit
Phil Purcell – former chairman and CEO of Morgan Stanley
Robert Reffkin – CEO and co-founder of Compass, Inc.
Cyriac Roeding – ShopKick cofounder and CEO
Tagg Romney - US venture capitalist
David O. Sacks – founder of Yammer
Sheryl Sandberg – COO of Facebook
Peter Sands – CEO of Standard Chartered Bank
Silvio Scaglia – founder of Fastweb
Paolo Scaroni – CEO, Eni – ex-CEO, Enel
Jonathan I. Schwartz – former CEO of Sun Microsystems
Lara Setrakian – founder of Syria Deeply
Kevin W. Sharer – former chairman and CEO of Amgen Inc.
António Simões (executive) – Banking executive, CEO Global Private Banking, HSBC
Jeff Skilling – former CEO of Enron
Tad Smith – CEO of Sotheby's
Jonathan Spector – CEO of The Conference Board
Gerald L. Storch – CEO of Hudson Bay and former chairman and CEO of Toys "R" Us
Stephan Sturm — CEO of Fresenius
Fred Swaniker – entrepreneur and co-founder of the African Leadership Academy
Tidjane Thiam – CEO of Credit Suisse and former CEO of Prudential
Pamela Thomas-Graham – Chief talent, branding and communications officer at Credit Suisse. Formerly CEO of CNBC
Evan Thornley – co-founder of LookSmart and CEO of Better Place
Peter Thum – founder, Ethos Water and social entrepreneur
Wayne Ting – CEO of Lime, former chief of staff to Uber CEO Dara Khosrowshahi
Parit Wacharasindhu — Thai politician and social entrepreneur
Amelia Warren Tyagi — daughter of Elizabeth Warren
Joey Wat — CEO of Yum China
Johanna Waterous — London-based Canadian businesswoman
Carlos Watson – former anchor for MSNBC and founder of news site OZY
Miles D. White – chairman and CEO of Abbott Laboratories
Sir Robert Worcester – founder of MORI
Peter Wuffli – former CEO of UBS AG
Tony Xu - CEO of DoorDash
Klaus Zumwinkel – ex-chairman of Deutsche Post
Jack Herrick – founder of WikiHow and eHow

Government
Bradley M. Berkson — last United States Department of Defense Director, Program Analysis and Evaluation
Lael Brainard – Board of Governors, U.S. Federal Reserve System
Esther Brimmer – former Assistant Secretary of State for International Organization Affairs
Ryan Brumberg – former U.S. Congressional candidate
Pete Buttigieg — Mayor of South Bend, Indiana and 2020 Presidential Candidate, current Secretary of Transportation
Mary Burke — former Wisconsin Secretary of Commerce
Sylvia Mathews Burwell – former U.S. Secretary of Health and Human Services; former director of the United States Office of Management and Budget
Rohit Chopra – consumer advocate and Commissioner on the U.S. Federal Trade Commission
Bjarne Corydon — Finance Minister of Denmark
Tom Cotton – U.S. Senator from Arkansas 
Jim Coutts (deceased) – Canadian Prime Ministerial advisor (1963–66, 1975–81)
Dan Debicella – Connecticut State Senator (2006-2010) and Congressional Candidate
Isabel Dedring – Deputy Mayor for Transport, City of London
Božidar Đelić – Serbian Minister of Economy and Finance (2001–2003), vice-president of the Government of Serbia (2007–2012)
Oleksandr Danylyuk — former Ukrainian Finance Minister
Stephen Donnelly — Fianna Fáil Member of Parliament and Irish Shadow Minister for Health. 
Roger W. Ferguson, Jr. – current President and CEO of TIAA-CREF; former vice chairman of the Board of Governors of the Federal Reserve System (2001–2006)
Thomas C. Foley — US ambassador to Ireland 
Robert G. Greenhill — President of the Canadian International Development Agency
William Hague – former foreign secretary of Britain and former leader of the Conservative party in the House of Commons
 Dennis F. Hightower - former Deputy Secretary, U.S. Department of Commerce
Wopke Hoekstra – Minister of Finance of the Netherlands (2017–present)
Wendell Hulcher — former mayor of Ann Arbor, Michigan
Reed Hundt – former chairman of the Federal Communications Commission (1993-1997)
Greg Hunt – Member of the Australian House of Representatives (2001–present)
Radovan Jelašić – former governor of the National Bank of Serbia
Bobby Jindal – Governor of the State of Louisiana (2008–2016); former member of the U.S. House of Representatives (2004–2008)
Nancy Killefer – Assistant Secretary for Management, CFO, and COO at the United States Department of the Treasury (1997–2000)
John D. Macomber – former President of the Export-Import Bank of the United States (1989–1992)
Jack Markell – Governor of Delaware
David McCormick – Business Executive, former U.S. Treasury Under Secretary for International Affairs
Karen Mills – former head of the Small Business Administration (SBA)
Toshimitsu Motegi – former minister for economy, trade and industry in Japan
Kyriakos Mitsotakis – Prime Minister of Greece (2019–Present)
Arthur Mutambara – Zimbabwean politician; former head of the Movement for Democratic Change
Naheed Nenshi – Mayor of Calgary (2010–present)
Greg Orman – former U.S. Senate candidate from Kansas
Peter Orszag – economist, Barack Obama's OMB director designate, former CBO director, formerly of the Brookings Institution
Joris Poort — US engineer
Susan E. Rice – American diplomat; former U.S. National Security Council Advisor and former U.S. Ambassador to the United Nations
Jayant Sinha – former finance minister for India and former Managing Director at Omidyar Network
Van Taylor – former U.S. Congressional candidate and current Texas state senator.
Eric Wiebes – State Secretary of Finance (2014–2017) and Minister of Economic Affairs and Climate Policy (2017–present) of the Netherlands
Einat Wilf — Israeli politician
Pieter Winsemius – former Dutch Minister of Housing, Spatial Planning and the Environment (1982–1986, 2006–2007)
Nadiem Makarim – Minister of Education and Culture of Indonesia (2019–Present)

Academics
Mahmoud Reza Banki – Iranian scientist
Christopher A. Bartlett – author, academic and professor emeritus at Harvard Business School
Scott C. Beardsley – Dean, Darden School of Business at the University of Virginia
Rufus Black –  Vice-Chancellor of the University of Tasmania
James C. Collins – academic, author Good to Great
Charles R. Conn — former warden and global CEO of Rhodes House and the Rhodes Trust
Angela Duckworth — A psychologist who studied and wrote about grit
Bernard T. Ferrari – Dean, Johns Hopkins University Carey Business School
Gerd Hahn — German economist
 Dennis F. Hightower - former Professor of Management at Harvard Business School
Yukio Ishizuka — Japanese psychologist
Kenneth E. Iverson — Canadian computer scientist 
Martin Roll — strategy author
Matthew C. Weinzierl - professor at Harvard Business School

Other
Paul Antony – chief medical officer of the Pharmaceutical Research and Manufacturers of America
Martin Neil Baily – Senior Fellow of the Brookings Institution
David Bennett – former CEO of Monitor (NHS)
Victor Cheng – author, blogger
David Churbuck - blogger; partner Sitrick And Company
Chelsea Clinton – Vice Chairman, Clinton Foundation, daughter of former U.S. President Bill Clinton and Secretary of State Hillary Clinton
Howard Davies – Chairman of the Royal Bank of Scotland; former director of the London School of Economics and former chairman of the British Financial Services Authority
Bill Drayton – founder and CEO of Ashoka
Aditya Tyagi – co-founder, i-Saksham, an organisation building young women as leaders of change
Anand Giridharadas – author
Chris Goodall – environmental author, speaker and consultant, as well as Green Party parliamentary candidate
Robert C. Gay — senior member of the Church of Jesus Christ of Latter-day Saints
Mohsin Hamid – author
Tom Hayhoe – healthcare director, former politician, and offshore racing sailor
Fred Hilmer – former CEO of Fairfax Media and former President and Vice Chancellor of University of South Wales
Lisa Joy — American screenwriter, director and producer and the co-creator of Westworld
Kazuyo Katsuma — Japanese author
Yul Kwon – business, law, government and media background; winner of reality TV show Survivor: Cook Islands in 2006
Phil Lapsley – electrical engineer, author and entrepreneur
Georgia Lee – filmmaker
Jeff Luhnow – General Manager of the Houston Astros
Dina Nayeri — Iranian American novelist
Thomas J. Peters – business author and speaker
Chris Philp – cofounder of Clearstone and member of British Parliament for Croydon South
Alejandro Plaz – founder of Súmate
Stuart Shilson — Assistant Private Secretary to Queen Elizabeth II in the Royal Household
Josh Singer — American screenwriter and producer
Adair Turner, Baron Turner of Ecchinswell – British businessperson, academic and technocrat; formerly served as chairman of the UK Financial Services Authority and the UK Financial Policy Committee
James Twining – former investment banker, McKinsey consultant and entrepreneur; current thriller writer
Luis Ubiñas – former president of the Ford Foundation
Kieran West — retired English rower and Olympic champion
Brett Wigdortz – founder of the charity Teach First
Jason Wright – team president of the Washington Football Team
Prince Friso of Orange-Nassau – Prince of the Dutch Royal family
Vienna Teng – singer, songwriter

References

McKinsey and Company
 
Employees by company